Sarah Abdali Idan (born 4 February 1990) is an Iraqi-American model, television host, musician and beauty pageant titleholder who was crowned as Miss Universe Iraq 2017 and represented Iraq at the Miss Universe 2017 pageant.

Early life 
Idan was born and raised in Baghdad to parents who were from the provinces of Babylon and Qadisiyah. When she was 13, Sarah taught herself English by listening to western music. After the 2003 invasion of Iraq, Sarah temporarily moved with her family to neighbouring Syria fleeing the civil war but eventually returned to Iraq a few years later. Her proficiency in English gave her the opportunity to work as a linguist for the US military at the age of 18. She also joined the U.S.-led Coalition forces stationed around Baghdad in 2009. The job allowed her to help her people and the US Government reduce the gap between the two cultures and gave her a good deal of experience in interacting with people from diverse backgrounds and high profile individuals at an early age. She later moved to the US and started working and going to school. Sarah graduated from Musicians Institute in performance arts in Hollywood, Los Angeles with emphasis on jazz and contemporary music. She describes herself as not very religious but more spiritual and a secular Muslim.

Career

Music 
In 2007, while living as a refugee in Syria, Idan attended a live concert of Enrique Iglesias in Damascus and realized that moment she wanted to be a musician. She met with Enrique and his band after the concert and became friend with pianist Michael Bluestein (member of the rock band Foreigner) whom she remained friends with through email. In 2014 they met again and performed together in a live jam in Los Angeles. Idan is a vocalist and can sing in English and Arabic.

After obtaining her vocal performance artist degree, she began writing music and performing in venues in Los Angeles. She wrote/composed and performed a song "Just for you" for the Egyptian movie Monkey Talks (El-Qird Beyitkallem). She performed numerous times on Egyptian TV from 2016-2017. She plays piano, guitar and harmonica and can sing in English, Arabic, Spanish, Portuguese and French.

Beauty pageants 
Idan was crowned Miss Iraq in America in 2016.

Idan was crowned in Miss Universe Iraq 2017. She represented Iraq at the Miss Universe 2017 pageant in Las Vegas. She is the first Iraqi model to participate in the Miss Universe pageant in 45 years. However, for taking selfies with Adar Gandelsman, who participated as Miss Israel at Miss Universe 2017, and for wearing a bikini in a swimsuit competition, many Iraqi people angered and later received death threats. Eventually, Idan was forced to flee Iraq with her family and immigrated to the United States in December 2017.

Television 
Starting January 2018 Sarah hosted an entertainment show with Indian news channel WION.

Visit to Israel 
In June 2018, Idan went to visit her friend Adar Gandelsman in Jerusalem. She toured in Mahane Yehuda Market where she was received warmly by the Israeli Jews of Iraqi origin. She described her visit by saying:

Regarding the Arab–Israeli conflict, she said:

 She is a supporter of Israel and believes the conflict is perpetuated by "the belief systems taught in Muslim countries, which are anti-Semitic" and is reinforced by biased media.

References

External links 
Video and photo gallery at Miss Universe web site

1990 births
Living people
Iraqi female models
Iraqi beauty pageant winners
Miss Universe 2017 contestants
Iraqi emigrants to the United States
21st-century Iraqi women singers
People from Baghdad
English language singers from Iraq
Arab supporters of Israel
Iraqi translators
Muslim supporters of Israel